All-Pro Football 2K8 is an American football game for seventh generation consoles. All-Pro Football 2K8 is the first football game to be published by 2K Sports since EA Sports purchased exclusive licenses to the intellectual properties of the NFL and NFLPA. John Elway, Barry Sanders, and Jerry Rice appear on the cover.

Overview
All-Pro Football 2K8 features a fictional league called the "All-Pro League", or 'APL'. The APL consists of 24 teams that are grouped into six divisions of four teams each. The league runs a sixteen-game schedule and holds a championship game at the end of the playoffs, similar to the NFL.

Since the exclusivity deal the NFL has with EA only covers team licenses, 2K contracted the individual rights to over 240 retired NFL players to appear in the game.

Even though there are no NFL teams in the game, the player can still create teams that resemble their NFL counterparts. A Create-a-Player feature allows the user to add in players that were not included in the roster.

Teams
Many of the teams in the game have one or more aspects that are veiled references to other elements of popular culture. While some link to sports teams past and present, others refer to TV, films, cars, comic books, American history and even Native American tradition. 

 New Jersey Assassins – The team plays at DiMeo Stadium, named after the DiMeo Crime Family. The crime family is the one Tony Soprano works for on The Sopranos. The Sopranos is set in New Jersey. Possibly a reference to the New York/New Jersey Hitmen of the XFL.
 New York Knights – Possibly a reference to the WLAF team, or the baseball team from the book and movie, The Natural. The team plays in a stadium that the game says was designed by G. L. Costanza, a reference to the Seinfeld character, who always wanted to be an architect.
 Boston Minutemen – Thinly veiled reference to the New England Patriots.
 Washington Federals – Possibly a reference to the former USFL team of the same name.
 Detroit Firebirds – A reference to Detroit's nickname of 'The Motor City' and the Pontiac Firebird automobile. For many years, the Lions played at the Silverdome in Pontiac, Michigan.
 Pittsburgh Iron Men – Possibly a reference to an early name used by the Steelers, circa 1940. Pittsburgh is known for its steel and iron industries. The city's real life NFL team is named the Pittsburgh Steelers. The Iron Men play at "Steel Mill Park", which is constructed of over 30,000 steel rivets. However, the team's colors are similar to the Jacksonville Jaguars.
 Ohio Red Dogs – Possibly a reference to an early NFL team known as the Canton Bulldogs and the former AFL team known as the New Jersey Red Dogs, which eventuality relocated to Cleveland. The Cleveland Browns have a section of fans known as "The Dawg Pound." The primary color of the Ohio State Buckeyes is red. It is fair to say that the Red Dogs are a nod to Ohio area sports culture.
 Carolina Cobras – Possibly a reference to the former arena football team of the same name. They play in a stadium called "The Extensive Enterprises Stadium". Extensive Enterprises was a front company for the Cobra Organization in the G.I. Joe comic book and animated series.
 Tampa Bay Top Guns – Possibly a reference to MacDill Air Force Base, which is in Tampa.
 Atlanta Wasps – The in-game stadium is named "Van Dyne Field", which is a reference to Janet Van Dyne, the superhero Wasp. Additionally, the Georgia Tech Yellow Jackets make their home in Atlanta.
 Miami Cyclones – A reference to the vast amounts of hurricanes in Miami, and the Miami Hurricanes college football team.
 Chicago Beasts – Their home stadium is named "Wolfram & Hart Stadium" after the law firm Wolfram & Hart in the TV series Angel.
 Milwaukee Indians– In many Native American tribes, Milwaukee means meeting place. This could also be a reference to the Indian Packing Company, the namesake of the Green Bay Packers.
 Seattle Sailors – A reference to the Seattle Mariners of Major League Baseball.
 Minneapolis Werewolves – A reference to the Minnesota Timberwolves of the NBA.
 Denver Cougars – veiled reference to the mascot of the NBA's Denver Nuggets, Rocky the Mountain Lion. The mountain lion is also known as the cougar.
 Dallas Gunfighters – Veiled reference to the Dallas Cowboys and USFL's San Antonio Gunslingers.
 St. Louis Rhinos – A reference to the NFL's Los Angeles Rams, who played in St. Louis at the time.
 San Francisco Sharks – Their home stadium is called "Amity Stadium", named after the town Amity in Jaws. Presumably named after the San Jose Sharks hockey team.
 Los Angeles Legends – Their home stadium is called "Miller Gold Stadium", presumably a reference to the HBO show Entourage and the Miller Gold Agency that is run by Ari Gold and Barbara Miller.
 Las Vegas Rollers– A reference to the many casinos in Las Vegas.
 Philadelphia Americans' – Philadelphia was a key meeting point for the Founding Fathers of the United States; the Declaration of Independence was signed there in 1776. The city is often referred to as 'The Birthplace of America'.

Reception

The Xbox 360 version received "generally favorable reviews", while the PlayStation 3 version received "average" reviews, according to the review aggregation website Metacritic. The gameplay of APF2K8 is considered better to the game play of Visual Concepts' previous title, ESPN NFL 2K5. However, All-Pro Football 2K8 received criticism for the lack of a multi-season Franchise Mode, as seen in competing titles such as Madden NFL 08 and NCAA Football 08, given ESPN NFL 2K5 contained a similar Franchise Mode. 2K Sports and Visual Concepts chose to omit a franchise mode because since the game revolves around the use of legends from different eras, they felt there would be no rational way for the legends to develop or age.

O. J. Simpson controversy
In a court ruling, O. J. Simpson was ordered to pay the family of Ronald Goldman any money made for his appearance in the game. Simpson was found not guilty of murdering his ex-wife Nicole Brown Simpson and Goldman in 1995, but was found legally responsible for their deaths by a civil court jury two years later. During pre-production of the game, Simpson was a member of the in-game team called the New Jersey Assassins. Players on the team perform a throat slash as a touchdown celebration, and the animatronic mascot for the Assassins will make a slashing motion. Some pre-release videos showed Simpson performing these moves, implying to some that the designers were intentionally referencing the murders. However, in the retail version of the game, Simpson was moved to the Cyclones.

See also
 Blitz: The League Madden NFL 08 ESPN NFL 2K5 NCAA Football 14''

References

External links
 

2007 video games
2K Sports games
American football video games
North America-exclusive video games
PlayStation 3 games
Xbox 360 games
Take-Two Interactive games
Video games developed in the United States